Susan Hale (December 5, 1833 – September 17, 1910) was an American author, traveler and artist. She devoted herself entirely to the art of painting in watercolors which she studied under English, French and German masters. Hale traveled extensively, sketching and visiting the galleries of the world. She was associated with her brother, the Rev. Edward Everett Hale, in the publication of The Family Flight series, which included the several countries she had visited. She also exhibited her pictures of the White Mountains in New Hampshire, of North Carolina scenery and of foreign scenes, in New York City and Boston. She edited Life and Letters of Thomas Gold Appleton (1885), and contributed numerous articles to periodicals.

Early life and education
She was born in Boston, Massachusetts to Nathan Hale and Sarah Preston Everett who had a total of eleven children. Susan's father, Nathan Hale, nephew and namesake of the patriot hero, was a lawyer and editor/owner of the Boston Daily Advertiser while her mother, also an author, was a sister of Edward Everett, a Unitarian minister and politician. Growing up, Susan was mostly the companion of her older sister Lucretia.

She was educated privately by tutors until she was 16, and then entered the school of George Barrell Emerson. Without any particular teaching, she learned to draw and to paint early in life.

Career
For many years, she was a successful teacher in Boston. She started on this occupation when her father became ill and the family income needed to be supplemented.
In 1860, she moved to Brookline with her family. Her father died there in 1862 and her mother in 1865. When the family situation broke up in 1867, Susan and her sister Lucretia went abroad to stay with their brother Charles who was consul general of the United States in Egypt. On returning from abroad, Susan took rooms at 91 Boylston Street in Boston and continued her teaching.

In 1872, she decided she wanted to get the best training in watercolor she could, and went abroad again and studied art in Paris, France, and Weimar, Germany, for nearly a year. When she returned in 1873, she began giving lessons in watercolors. She lived and maintained a studio in the Art Club at 64 Boylston Street.  Later, she began holding meetings where she read or talked to people.

In 1885, she began to keep house at the summer home of her brother, Edward, in Matunuck, Rhode Island, which she called home until her death in 1910.  Her brother and his wife had gone abroad to look after their sick daughter. Susan eventually moved most of her things to Matunuck, and began to spend time there regularly during summers. During winters, she traveled. In earlier years, she had spent winters working in Boston and traveled in the summer, sometimes accompanying well-known friends such as Thomas Gold Appleton and Frederic Edwin Church. She continued visiting Boston between her travels abroad and her stays at Matunuck. Her watercolors were mostly landscapes done during her travels; she also described her travels in vivid detail in letters to her sister, Lucretia.

Hale died at her summer home in Matunuck, in 1910.

Selected works 

 A Family Flight through France, Germany, Norway and Switzerland. 1881 (with Edward Everett Hale)
 A Family Flight over Egypt and Syria. 1882 (with Edward Everett Hale)
 A Family Flight through Spain. 1883
 Self-Instructive Lessons in Painting with Oil and Water-Colors on Silk, Satin, Velvet, and Other Fabrics Including Lustra Painting and the Use of Other Mediums.  1885
 Men and Manners of the Eighteenth Century.  1898
 Addison and Gay.  1898
 Young Americans in Spain.  1899
 Letters of Susan Hale.  1919
 Nonsense Book; A Collection of Limericks.  1919
 Inklings for Thinklings.  1919

References

Attribution

Bibliography
 "Hale, Susan." American Authors 1600 – 1900. H. W. Wilson Company, NY 1938.
 Ingebritsen, Shirley Phillips. "Hale, Susan" Notable American Women. Vol. 2, 4th ed., The Belknap Press of Harvard University Press, 1975
 readseries.com Accessed July 10, 2007
 askart.com Accessed July 10, 2007

External links 

 Dorchester Atheneum
 
 

1833 births
1910 deaths
19th-century American writers
19th-century American women writers
Painters from Massachusetts
19th-century American painters
20th-century American painters
19th-century American women artists
20th-century American women artists
Artists from Boston
American women painters
19th-century travelers
American watercolorists
Women watercolorists